Mahindra Tractors is an Indian agricultural machinery manufacturer. It is part of the Mahindra & Mahindra corporation. In 2010, Mahindra became the world's highest-selling tractor brand by volume. Mahindra's largest consumer base is in India. It also has a growing market in North America and Australia. The company is the largest tractor manufacturer in India and has the capacity to build 150,000 tractors a year.

M&M produced its first tractor in 1963, the Mahindra B-275 by forming a joint venture with International Harvester to manufacture tractors carrying the Mahindra nameplate for the Indian 
market. Mahindra Tractors sold about 85,000 units annually making it one of the largest tractor producers in the world. To expand into the growing tractor market in China, Mahindra acquired majority stake in Jiangling.

To raise awareness about Mahindra in the US, Mahindra USA announced its new sponsorship in the NASCAR Nationwide Series with R3 Motorsports, which is participating with a #23 Mahindra Tractors Chevrolet. The car was driven by Robert Richardson Jr. With this sponsorship, Mahindra was the first Indian company to sponsor a car in NASCAR. In 2008, Mahindra was a sponsor of the MacDonald Motorsports team which ran the #81 car in the NASCAR Nationwide Series.  They currently are a sponsor in NASCAR for Stewart-Haas Racing in the NASCAR Cup Series for Chase Briscoe.

Mahindra operations
Mahindra Tractors largest consumer base is in India and China. Also has a fairly large customer base in the Indian Subcontinent, United States, Australia, Serbia, Chile, Syria, Iran and a major part of the African continent. Mahindra operates in China, North America and Australia through its subsidiaries, Jiangling, Mahindra USA and Mahindra Australia. It also operates in some Indian states through its subsidiaries Mahindra Gujarat and Swaraj.

Mahindra India

Mahindra Tractors is number one in sales in India - the largest tractor market in the world - and it has been the market leader since 1983. Its sales are predominantly in the states of Gujarat, Haryana, Punjab, Maharashtra and the Southern States. Its sales in Gujarat are under the label Mahindra Gujarat and its sales in Punjab are under the label Swaraj. In 1999, Mahindra purchased 100% of Gujarat Tractors from the Government of Gujarat. and Mahindra purchased a 64.6% stake in Swaraj in 2004.

Mahindra Tractors started manufacturing 15HP tractor under the brand name Yuvraj in Rajkot in 2011. The plant in Rajkot is set up jointly by Deepak Diesel Pvt Ltd and Mahindra & Mahindra. The plant has a maximum capacity of 30000 tractors per annum.

Mahindra USA

In 1994, the company entered the American market as Mahindra USA; it has a sales and service network throughout the country. Mahindra USA, a subsidiary of Mahindra Tractors, is responsible for sales in North America. Mahindra has five assembly plants in the US—one at its North American headquarters in Houston, Texas, another in Marysville, California and one in Chattanooga, Tennessee. In August 2012, Mahindra USA opened its fourth assembly and distribution center in Bloomsburg, Pennsylvania. In 2014, Mahindra USA opened its fifth assembly and distribution center in Lyons, Kansas.

In addition to building their own tractors, Mahindra also sources tractors from other manufacturers. For the USA market, Mahindra has purchased their core products from Tong Yang Moolsan, one of the top tractor manufacturers in South Korea, to cover selected product ranges.

Mahindra Australia
Based in Brisbane, Mahindra Australia is a branch of Mahindra & Mahindra Ltd. In 2005, the company entered the Australian market with the launch of its assembly & customer support centre in Acacia Ridge, QLD. Currently, the company's products are sold and serviced by 40 dealers throughout Australia. Mahindra Australia is also responsible for sales in New Zealand and the rest of Australasia. The Company's products are distributed in Fiji by Carpenters Motors.
In Western Australia and South Australia, Mahindra tractors are distributed by McIntosh Distribution.

Mahindra China
In 2004, Mahindra purchased 80% stake in Jiangling Tractors Company from Jiangling Motor Company in China for $8 million. After the purchase, the company was renamed as Mahindra (China) Tractors Company Limited (MCTCL).

In February 2009, to strengthen its sales figure, Mahindra formed a joint venture by buying stakes of Jiangsu Yueda Yancheng Tractors Company Limited from Jiangsu Yueda Group. After the purchase, the company was renamed as Mahindra Yueda Yancheng Tractors Company Limited (MYYTCL). In 2012, Mahindra decided to consolidate both of its Chinese ventures into a single entity by buying 88.55% stakes of MCTCL from Mahindra Overseas Investment (Mauritius) Company Ltd. and making it a subsidiary of MYYTCL in its joint venture with Jiangsu Yueda Group.

After operations for over five years, Mahindra sold its 51% stake in the joint venture with Jiangsu Yueda Group for ¥82 million and stated that it would review its strategy in China and would start its own independent entity in the market.

Brands

Mahindra India
Swaraj
Trakstar - Gromax Agri Equipment Ltd.
ITMCO-Mahindra
Jiangling
FengShou
Lenar
Mahindra Agribusiness - founded in 2000 to incorporate the entire food chain.

Assembly plants

Domestic (India)
Mumbai, Maharashtra
Nagpur, Maharashtra
Mohali, Punjab
Jaipur, Rajasthan
Rudrapur, Uttarakhand
Zahirabad, Telangana
Rajkot, Gujarat
Vadodara, Gujarat
Amreli, Gujarat

Mahindra Australia
Brisbane, Australia

United States
Chattanooga, Tennessee
Houston, Texas
Marysville, California
Bloomsburg, Pennsylvania
Lyons, Kansas
Detroit, Michigan ( R&D Plant )

Africa
Chad
Gambia
Mali
Nigeria
Ghana
Benin
Somalia

Competitors
Case IH
John Deere
Kubota
Massey Ferguson
New Holland
SAS Motors
Sonalika
TAFE

References

External links

Mahindra Corporate webpage

Mahindra Group
Agricultural machinery manufacturers of India
Tractor manufacturers of India
Manufacturing companies based in Mumbai